Ella Sings Broadway is a 1963 (see 1963 in music) studio album (recorded during three sessions in Los Angeles, October 3, 4 & 9, 1962) by the American jazz singer Ella Fitzgerald, with an orchestra arranged and conducted by Frank DeVol. Shortly before the sessions for  Ella Sings Broadway,  Ella had recorded two singles with Marty Paich, the Antonio Carlos Jobim song 'Desafinado' and a Bossa Nova version of the jazz standard 'Stardust' (Los Angeles, October 1, 1962). This prompted many Ella Fitzgerald fans and scholars to conclude that these sessions were also led by Paich (the Verve-issued album does not credit an arranger). However, the original scores and parts exist in Ella Fitzgerald's library and it was determined that all the music was arranged by Frank DeVol. In fact, DeVol had previously worked with Ella Fitzgerald having written arrangements for Hello Love (1957), Get Happy (1957), Live Someone in Love (1957), Ella Sings Sweet Songs For Swingers (1958), and Ella Wishes You A Swinging Christmas (1960).

This album is a musical departure for Ella in many senses. As the author David Hajdu comments in his liner notes for the 2001 reissue of  Ella Sings Broadway , virtually every important singer of standards had recorded an album of musical-theatre songs, Sinatra with My Kind of Broadway and The Concert Sinatra (an album often mistaken for a live recording), Sarah Vaughan with  Great Songs From Hit Shows  and Doris Day with  Show Time .

These singers, especially Sinatra and Fitzgerald, had acquired a reputation of being consummate performers of the Great American Songbook, a songbook which by and large had been written before the outbreak of the Second World War, and which had been aped in its popularity with youth by Rock and Roll by the time of the Vietnam War. With many  George and Ira Gershwin, Porter and Berlin standards having been written in the 1920s and 1930s, whilst Sinatra and Fitzgerald were growing up.

On  Ella Sings Broadway , Ella connects with the Broadway songs of the previous decade and a half, vastly different in musical terms to the Great American Songbook standards from 40 years previously.

The twelve songs are from eight musicals, being;

 "Warm All Over"  and "Somebody Somewhere" from Frank Loesser's The Most Happy Fella (1956)
 "If I Were a Bell" and  "Guys and Dolls"  from Frank Loesser's Guys and Dolls (1950)
 "Almost Like Being in Love" from Lerner and Loewe's Brigadoon (1947)
 "I Could Have Danced All Night" and "Show Me" from Lerner and Loewe's My Fair Lady (1956)
 "No Other Love" from Rodgers and Hammerstein's Me and Juliet (1953)
 "Dites-Moi" from Rodgers and Hammerstein's South Pacific (1949)
 "Hernando's Hideaway" and "Steam Heat" from Adler and Ross's Pajama Game (1954)
 "Whatever Lola Wants" from Adler and Ross's Damn Yankees (1955)

Awarded 4 stars by Down Beat jazz magazine in 1963, the review commented that it was "A perfect complement to Fitzgerald's classic series of 'Song Book' albums".

Track listing
For the 1963 Verve LP release; Verve V6-4059; Re-issued in 2001 on CD, Verve 549 373-2

Side One:
"Hernando's Hideaway" (Richard Adler, Jerry Ross) – 3:17
"If I Were a Bell" (Frank Loesser) – 2:22
"Warm All Over" (Loesser) – 2:46
"Almost Like Being in Love" (Alan Jay Lerner, Frederick Loewe) – 3:02
"Dites-Moi" (Richard Rodgers, Oscar Hammerstein II) – 2:30
"I Could Have Danced All Night" (Lerner, Loewe) – 2:22
Side Two:
"Show Me" (Lerner, Loewe) – 2:22
"No Other Love" (Rodgers, Hammerstein) – 2:20
"Steam Heat" (Adler, Ross) – 3:27
"Whatever Lola Wants" (Adler, Ross) – 3:13
"Guys and Dolls" (Loesser) – 2:21
"Somebody Somewhere" (Loesser) – 3:12

Personnel
Recorded October 3, 4 & 9, 1962 at Capitol Studios,  Hollywood, Los Angeles:

 Val Valentin - Engineer

Tracks 1-12

 Ella Fitzgerald - vocals
 Frank DeVol - arranger, conductor

Others Unknown.

References

1963 albums
Ella Fitzgerald albums
Verve Records albums
Albums produced by Norman Granz
Albums arranged by Marty Paich
Albums conducted by Marty Paich
Albums recorded at Capitol Studios